Fort Green is an unincorporated community and census-designated place (CDP) in Hardee County, Florida, United States. Its population was 78 as of the 2020 census.

Geography
Fort Green is in northwestern Hardee County, bordered to the north by Polk County and to the south by Fort Green Springs. Brewster Road is the main road through the community, leading south  to State Road 62 in Fort Green Springs and north  to State Road 37 at Bradley Junction.

Payne Creek, an east-flowing tributary of the Peace River, forms the southern border of the CDP.

Demographics

References

Unincorporated communities in Hardee County, Florida
Unincorporated communities in Florida
Census-designated places in Hardee County, Florida
Census-designated places in Florida